Chrysophyllum pomiferum is a tree in the family Sapotaceae, native to tropical South America.

Description
Its brown bark is scaly. Fascicles feature up to 10 greenish-white flowers.

Distribution and habitat
Chrysophyllum pomiferum is native to northern and western South America, including northern Brazil.

References

pomiferum
Flora of northern South America
Flora of western South America
Flora of North Brazil
Plants described in 1936
Taxa named by Pierre Joseph Eyma